Jeremi Suri is an American historian and the Mack Brown Distinguished Chair for Leadership in Global Affairs at the University of Texas at Austin.

Life 
He graduated from Stanford University with a bachelor's in history in 1994. He then obtained a master's in history from Ohio University followed by a Ph.D. in history from Yale University. While at Yale, he wrote a dissertation titled "Convergent Responses to Disorder: Cultural Revolution and Détente among the Great Powers during the 1960s."

Suri has received many prizes for his teaching and research. In 2007, Smithsonian Magazine named him one of America's "Top Young Innovators" in the Arts and Sciences.

In 2012, Suri was Mack Brown Distinguished Professor for Global Leadership, History, and Public Policy at the University of Texas at Austin. That year, he spoke at the independently organized TedxSMU event.

Jeremi is a frequent public lecturer and guest on radio and television programs. His writings appear widely in blogs and print media, including Foreign Policy.

He has said that he is half Jewish and half Hindu.

Works

Books 
 Power and Protest: Global Revolution and the Rise of Detente. Cambridge, Mass.: Harvard University Press (2009). .
 Henry Kissinger and the American Century. Cambridge, Mass.: Harvard University Press (2009). .
 Liberty's Surest Guardian: Rebuilding Nations After War from the Founders to Obama. New York: Free Press (2012). .
 The Impossible Presidency: The Rise and Fall of America's Highest Office. New York: Basic Books (2017). .

Selected articles 
"Hamilton Fish Armstrong, the 'American Establishment,' and Cosmopolitan Nationalism." Princeton University Library Chronicle, vol. 63, no. 3 (Spring 2002), pp. 438–65. . .
 "Foreword: 'A Peace That Is No Peace': The Cold War as Contemporary History." OAH Magazine of History, vol. 24, no. 4 (October 2010), pp. 5–6. .
 "Conflict and Co-Operation in the Cold War: New Directions in Contemporary Historical Research." Journal of Contemporary History, vol. 46, no. 1 (January 2011), pp. 5–9. .

References

External links 
 
 Jeremi Suri at the Woodrow Wilson Center
 "Jeremi Suri: History of American Power" (interview) on the Lex Fridman Podcast, no. 180 (April 29, 2021)
 "Jeremi Suri: Civil War, Slavery, Freedom, and Democracy" (interview) on the Lex Fridman Podcast, no. 354 (Jan 25, 2023)

Living people
21st-century American historians
21st-century American male writers
Year of birth missing (living people)
Stanford University alumni
Ohio University alumni
Yale University alumni
University of Texas at Austin faculty
American male non-fiction writers